Curtis L. "Curt" Hofstad (February 1, 1946 – June 18, 2016) was an American politician. He was a member of the North Dakota House of Representatives from the 15th District, serving since 2006. He was a member of the Republican party. Hofstad lived in Devils Lake, North Dakota and graduated from North Dakota State University. He was a farmer. Hofstad served on the Devils Lake Airpoty Authority and the Starkweather School Board. Hofstad died in office of an apparent heart attack on June 18, 2016, aged 70.

References

1946 births
2016 deaths
Farmers from North Dakota
School board members in North Dakota
Republican Party members of the North Dakota House of Representatives
People from Devils Lake, North Dakota
North Dakota State University alumni
21st-century American politicians